The 10th SS Panzer Division "Frundsberg" was a German Waffen-SS armoured division during World War II. The division's first battles were in Ukraine in April 1944. Afterwards, the unit was then transferred to the west, where it fought the Allies in France and at Arnhem. The division was moved to Pomerania, then fought south east of Berlin in the Lusatian area until the end of the war.

History
The division received the honor title Frundsberg after the 16th Century German commander Georg von Frundsberg. The division was mainly formed from conscripts. It first saw action at Tarnopol in April 1944 and later took part in the relief of the German troops cut off in the Kamenets-Podolsky pocket.

It was then sent to Normandy to counter the Allied landings, where, along with the SS Division Hohenstaufen, it took part in fighting against the Allied Operation Epsom.They spent the rest of July repulsing British attacks against Hill 112 and Hill 113, most notably during Operation Jupiter. After two weeks of fighting in August against the British during Operation Bluecoat and the Americans at Domfront the division was like many other units encircled at Falaise. They were intended to take part in the counterattack conducted by the II. SS-Panzerkorps but due to the confusion and chaos in the pocket the attack broke down. SS-Panzer-Grenadier-Regiment 21 struck towards St. Lambert but got repulsed. After that the planned attack of the Frundsberg was abandoned and they were ordered to break out between St. Lambert and Chambois. The division suffered heavy casualties and retreated into Belgium before being sent to be reconstituted near Arnhem, where it soon fought the Allied airborne troops during Operation Market Garden at Nijmegen, in the Netherlands, when together with the 9th SS Panzer division it constituted the II SS Panzer Corps. The division however suffered heavy losses in the ensuing counter offensive against the Nijmegen salient in early October. After rebuilding, it fought in the Alsace in January 1945. It was then sent to the Eastern Front, where it fought against the Red Army in Pomerania and then Saxony. Encircled in the Halbe Pocket, the division effected a breakout and retreated through Moritzburg, before reaching the area of Teplice in Czechoslovakia, where the division surrendered to the US Army at the end of the war.

Günter Grass
German writer and Nobel laureate Günter Grass was trained as a tank crewman with the SS division at the age of 17 in November 1944. He was wounded in action on 25 April 1945 and captured in a hospital.

Organisation 
The organisation structure of this SS formation was as follows:

Commanders

Area of operations
 France, (January 1943 – March 1944 on formation)
 Eastern Front, Southern sector (March – April 1944)
 Poland, (April – June 1944)
 France, (June – September 1944)
 Belgium & the Netherlands, (September – October 1944)
 West Germany, (October 1944 – February 1945)
 Northwest Germany, (February – March 1945)
 East Germany and Czechoslovakia, (March – May 1945)
 Surrender and disbandment

See also
 List of Waffen-SS units
 SS Panzer Division order of battle

References

10
German units in Normandy
Military units and formations established in 1943
Panzer divisions of the Waffen-SS
Military units and formations disestablished in 1945
1943 establishments in Germany
1945 disestablishments in Germany